14U (Hangul: 원포유) was a South Korean boy band formed by BG Entertainment in Incheon, South Korea. The group debuted on July 22, 2017, with a single album "VVV," and disbanded on May 10, 2019.

Members

Past members
E.Sol (이솔) – leader
Luha (루하)
Gohyeon (고현)
B.S. (비에스) 
Loudi (로우디)
Eunjae (은재)
Woojoo (우주)
Dohyuk (도혁)
Hyunwoong (현웅)
Hero (영웅)
Rio (리오)
Sejin (세진)
Gyeongtae (경태)
Gun (건)
Doyool (도율)

Discography

Singles

References

K-pop music groups
South Korean boy bands
South Korean dance music groups
Musical groups from Seoul
Musical groups established in 2017
2017 establishments in South Korea
South Korean pop music groups